Robert Benjamin "Speck" Searcy, Jr. (January 8, 1901 – December 22, 1967) was an American politician who served as mayor of Huntsville, Alabama from 1952 to 1964.

He was the mayor of Huntsville when President Dwight D. Eisenhower established the George C. Marshall Space Flight Center at Redstone Arsenal in Huntsville, Alabama, as the home for the National Aeronautics and Space Administration (NASA) on July 1, 1960. The center became the civilian base for Dr. Wernher von Braun who was the center's first Director, presiding from July 1960 to February 1970.

Searcy is buried at Maple Hill Cemetery in Huntsville.

References 

1901 births
1967 deaths
Mayors of Huntsville, Alabama
20th-century American politicians